Fortville is a town in Vernon Township, Hancock County, Indiana, United States. The population was 4,784 at the 2020 census.

Geography
Fortville is located in the northwest corner of Hancock County, Indiana at  (39.934740, -85.847237), immediately adjacent to neighboring Hamilton  County, which forms the town's northwest boundary and Madison County, which borders to the north.

Despite occasional droughts throughout central Indiana, Fortville has a steady and reliable supply of water because it is situated over a natural aquifer.

History
Fortville was originally called Walpole, and under the latter name was laid out and platted in 1849. It was named for Cephas Fort, the original owner of the town site. Fortville was incorporated as a town in 1865.

The historic Browne-Rafert House on Merrill Street was listed on the National Register of Historic Places in 2015.

Demographics

2010 census
As of the census of 2010, there were 3,929 people, 1,553 households, and 1,060 families living in the town. The racial makeup of the town was 96.2% White, 1.3% Black, 0.3% Native American, 0.1% Asian, 0.9% from other races, and 1.3% from two or more races. Hispanic or Latino of any race were 2.3% of the population.

There were 1,553 households, of which 37.7% had children under the age of 18 living with them, 47.6% were married couples living together, 14.5% had a female householder with no husband present, 6.1% had a male householder with no wife present, and 31.7% were non-families. 26.8% of all households were made up of individuals, and 9.1% had someone living alone who was 65 years of age or older. The average household size was 2.53 and the average family size was 3.03.

The median age in the town was 35.7 years. 28.3% of residents were under the age of 18; 7.4% were between the ages of 18 and 24; 28.4% were from 25 to 44; 24.1% were from 45 to 64; and 11.6% were 65 years of age or older. The gender makeup of the town was 48.6% male and 51.4% female.

2000 census
As of the census of 2000, there were 3,444 people, 1,394 households, and 950 families living in the town. The racial makeup of the town was 98.14% White, 0.06% African American, 0.06% Native American, 0.17% Asian, 0.73% from other races, and 0.84% from two or more races. Hispanic or Latino of any race were 1.74% of the population.

There were 1,394 households, out of which 36.2% had children under the age of 18 living with them, 52.4% were married couples living together, 11.9% had a female householder with no husband present, and 31.8% were non-families. 27.8% of all households were made up of individuals, and 11.8% had someone living alone who was 65 years of age or older. The average household size was 2.46 and the average family size was 3.03.

In the town, the population was spread out, with 27.8% under the age of 18, 7.9% from 18 to 24, 33.0% from 25 to 44, 19.4% from 45 to 64, and 11.9% who were 65 years of age or older. The median age was 34 years. For every 100 females there were 91.2 males. For every 100 females age 18 and over, there were 85.2 males.

The median income for a household in the town was $42,642, and the median income for a family was $49,010. Males had a median income of $37,723 versus $25,951 for females. The per capita income for the town was $17,745. About 4.3% of families and 6.5% of the population were below the poverty line, including 9.8% of those under age 18 and 8.4% of those age 65 or over.

Parks
Landmark Park is located at Staat Street and Veteran's Court, just east of Main Street.

The entrance to Memorial Park is located just west of Church and McCarty streets.

Education
The town houses schools for the Mt. Vernon Community Schools Corporation. The district houses three elementary schools, one middle school, and one high school. The schools regularly receive an "A+" score from the State of Indiana.

The town has a lending library, the Fortville-Vernon Township Public Library.

Economy 
Fortville's historic downtown is home to local retailers, restaurants, and service providers. The downtown is also an attraction for arts and culture.

References

External links
Town website
Fortville/McCordsville Chamber of Commerce
City Data

Towns in Hancock County, Indiana